Huang Liang-chi (born 8 March 1992) is a Taiwanese tennis player playing on the ATP Challenger Tour. On 11 August 2014, he reached his highest ATP singles ranking of 172 and his highest doubles ranking of 223 achieved on 22 October 2012.

Tour titles

Doubles

External links
 
 

1992 births
Living people
Taiwanese male tennis players
Tennis players at the 2010 Asian Games
Tennis players at the 2010 Summer Youth Olympics
Universiade medalists in tennis
Universiade silver medalists for Chinese Taipei
Universiade bronze medalists for Chinese Taipei
Sportspeople from Tainan
Asian Games competitors for Chinese Taipei
Medalists at the 2011 Summer Universiade
Medalists at the 2013 Summer Universiade
Medalists at the 2015 Summer Universiade
21st-century Taiwanese people